The enigmatic gecko (Hemidactylus barodanus) is a species of gecko. It is found in Ethiopia and Somalia.

References

Hemidactylus
Reptiles described in 1901